The fourth season of the American fictional drama television series ER first aired on September 25, 1997, and concluded on May 14, 1998.  The fourth season consists of 22 episodes.

Plot 
Season four opens with the live episode "Ambush", performed twice (once for the East coast, once for the West coast).  Dr. Morgenstern, head of the ER, has a heart attack, threatening his life.  Weaver agrees to temporarily step in until he recovers. Unfortunately, when Morgenstern does come back, he cannot perform surgery like he used to do because he now knows what it is like to be a patient. After a surgical accident takes a man's life, Morgenstern decides to permanently step down as head of the ER and he leaves the hospital.

Two new physicians join the ER:  Dr. Anna Del Amico, played by Maria Bello and a new British surgeon Dr. Elizabeth Corday, played by Alex Kingston. Corday came to America under the fellowship of Dr. Robert "Rocket" Romano (played by Paul McCrane), but their relationship sours towards the end of the season. After she rejects Romano when he asks her out, he decides not to renew her fellowship. She is forced to choose whether she moves back to England or stays in America as an intern. 

Meanwhile, as Greene copes with his beating, he and Ross travel to California to bury Ross' dad. While there, Greene visits his own parents, where he finds out that his mother is sick, and his relationship with his dad continues to be strained. Back in Chicago, he begins to date new ER desk clerk Cynthia Hooper (played by Mariska Hargitay). The relationship is purely physical, and when Greene has to visit his parents again later in the season, she comes along uninvited, only to realize that Greene does not love her. After the awkward breakup, Cynthia leaves, but Greene stays to take care of his ailing mother and begin to mend his relationship with his father.

Ross and Hathaway get more serious when Ross surprises Hathaway and proposes to her in front of the ER staff, which she accepts. She later has commitment issues when she kisses a vulnerable paramedic. She tells Ross, and he reacts angrily. After a short time, Ross forgives her and tells her he will wait until she is ready to marry. In addition, Hathaway is able to open a free clinic in the ER with the help of Carter's grandmother. Ross vies for a pediatric attending position in the ER.

A lonely Corday starts a relationship with Benton, which causes friction with Benton's family because she is white.

Weaver attends a Synergix seminar to see how to better manage the ER. She begins to date a Synergix representative, Ellis West, who advises her to fire a physician's assistant, which happens to be Jeanie Boulet. Jeanie fights for her job, claiming that she was fired because of her HIV status. Facing a lawsuit, Chief of Staff Donald Anspaugh decides to hire her back. Weaver begins to see Synergix's dark side, and breaks up with West because she feels he is using her, effectively cutting off all ties with Synergix. During all of this, Jeanie's ex-husband, Al, is forced to reveal his HIV status. This gets him fired and forces him to look for a job in Atlanta, and he asks Jeanie to join him. Jeanie refuses, and Al leaves her. Later in the season, Jeanie cares for Anspaugh's cancer stricken son, because she is the only person able to get through to him. After he dies, Anspaugh feels much gratitude and remorse towards Jeanie, given her prior termination.

Carter pretends to be of humble origins in order to impress Anna, which fails when she finds out he actually comes from a wealthy family. Despite this, the two still become good friends, and she helps Carter help his cousin Chase detoxify from a heroin addiction.  She had experience in the subject, considering her ex-boyfriend went through a similar experience.  Unfortunately, their efforts were in vain, because Chase started using again, eventually crippling him for life.  At the end of the season, Anna's ex-boyfriend comes to the hospital to see if the ER is in need of a pediatrics attending. Anna is still in love with him, and faces a decision about her future in the ER. While Mark is away, a large explosion sends multiple patients to the ER. Weaver briefly has a seizure after being exposed to the toxic fumes. Mark returns and has fully recovered from his beating.

Production
Original executive producers John Wells and Michael Crichton reprised their roles. Lydia Woodward also returned as an executive producer and writer. Carol Flint became a fourth executive producer. Flint was replaced as co-executive producer by Christopher Chulack. Chulack was previously a regular director and a producer for the third season. Paul Manning left his supervising producer role but remained involved with the series as an executive consultant. Long-time crew members Lance Gentile and Neal Baer were promoted to producers for the fourth season. Third season co-producers Wendy Spence Rosato and Penny Adams returned to their positions. Jack Orman and David Mills joined them as new co-producers and writers. Mills left the show midway through the season. Following his departure Adams was promoted to producer and Richard Thorpe and Michael Salamunovich joined the production team as co-producers. Thorpe had previously worked on the series as both a cinematographer and director. Salamunovich was the series unit production manager for the first three seasons and continued to fulfill this role as a co-producer. Michael Hissrich continued to serve as an associate producer. Manning, Hissrich, and Gentile all left the crew with the close of the season.

The series executive producers took a back seat to new writers in the fourth season. Wells' writing role was limited to just two episodes. Woodward wrote a single episode. Manning wrote a further episode. Flint wrote two episodes. Baer wrote two episodes while Gentile wrote a single episode and continued to serve as the series medical consultant. New co-producer Jack Orman contributed to four episodes as a writer. Mills wrote two episodes before leaving the series. New writer Walon Green wrote three episodes. Third season regular writer Samantha Howard Corbin became a story editor and wrote three more episodes. She was promoted to executive story editor mid-season. New writer Linda Gase wrote two episodes. Joe Sachs returned as technical adviser and wrote a further episode. 

Chulack continued to serve as the series' most prominent director and helmed a further four episodes. Thorpe directed three more episodes. Charles Haid returned to the series for the first time since the first season to helm two episodes. New director Darnell Martin was the season's only other repeat director with two episodes. Other directors making their series debut with the fourth season were executive producer John Wells, Christopher Misiano, T.R. Subramaniam, and Sarah Pia Anderson. Regular directors returning to the series for single episodes include Jonathan Kaplan, Félix Enríquez Alcalá, Lesli Linka Glatter, and Thomas Schlamme. Cast member Anthony Edwards moved behind the camera to direct a further episode of the series. Editor Jacque Toberen and producer Lance Gentile each directed a single episode of the fourth season.

Cast

Main cast
 Anthony Edwards as Dr. Mark Greene – Attending Physician
 George Clooney as Dr. Doug Ross – Pediatric Emergency Medicine Fellow
 Noah Wyle as Dr. John Carter – Intern PGY-2
 Julianna Margulies as Carol Hathaway – Nurse Manager
 Gloria Reuben as Jeanie Boulet – Physician Assistant
 Laura Innes as Dr. Kerry Weaver – Attending Physician
 Maria Bello as Dr. Anna Del Amico – Pediatric Emergency Medicine Fellow
 Alex Kingston as Dr. Elizabeth Corday – Surgical Trauma Fellow
 Eriq La Salle as Dr. Peter Benton – Surgical Resident PGY-5

Supporting cast

Doctors and Medical students
 William H. Macy as Dr. David Morgenstern – Chief of Surgery and Chief of Emergency Medicine
 Sam Anderson as Dr. Jack Kayson – Chief of Cardiology
 John Aylward as Dr. Donald Anspaugh – Chief of Staff
 CCH Pounder as Dr. Angela Hicks – Surgical Attending Physician
 Paul McCrane as Dr. Robert Romano – Surgical Attending Physician
 Jorja Fox as Dr. Maggie Doyle – Resident PGY-2
 David Brisbin as Dr. Alexander Babcock – Anesthesiologist
 Clancy Brown as Dr. Ellis West – Associate ER Attending Physician
 Michael Buchman Silver as Dr. Paul Meyers – Psychiatrist
 Matthew Glave as Dr. Dale Edson – Resident PGY-2
 Chad Lowe as George Henry – Medical Student
Don Perry as Dr. Sam Breedlove – Surgeon
 Megan Cole as Dr. Alice Upton – Pathologist
 Ted Rooney as Dr. Tabash – Neonatologist
 Perry Anzilotti as Dr. Ed – Anesthesiologist 
 Kenneth Alan Williams	as Dr. Thomas Gabriel
 Alice Amter as Dr. Miriam Nagarvala
 Kenneth Tigar as Dr. Keinholz
 Kathleen Lloyd as Dr. Mack
 Dennis Boutsikaris as Dr. David Kotlowitz
 Justin Henry as James Sasser – Medical Student 
 Joel de la Fuente as Ivan Fu – Medical Student 

Nurses
 Ellen Crawford as Nurse Lydia Wright
Conni Marie Brazelton as Nurse Conni Oligario
 Deezer D as Nurse Malik McGrath
 Laura Cerón as Nurse Chuny Marquez
 Yvette Freeman as Nurse Haleh Adams
 Lily Mariye as Nurse Lily Jarvik
 Gedde Watanabe as Nurse Yosh Takata
 Dinah Lenney as Nurse Shirley
 Kyle Richards as Nurse Dori Kerns 
 Bellina Logan as Nurse Kit
 Suzanne Carney as OR Nurse Janet
 Tricia Dong as Nurse Joyce

Staff, Paramedics and Officers
 Abraham Benrubi as Desk Clerk Jerry Markovic
 Mariska Hargitay as Desk Clerk Cynthia Hooper
 Kristin Minter as Desk Clerk Miranda "Randi" Fronczak
 Erica Gimpel as Social Worker Adele Newman
 Christine Healy as Hospital Administrator Harriet Spooner
 George Eads as Paramedic Greg Powell
Emily Wagner as Paramedic Doris Pickman
 Montae Russell as Paramedic Dwight Zadro
Lyn Alicia Henderson as Paramedic Pamela Olbes
Brian Lester as Paramedic Brian Dumar
J.P. Hubbell as Paramedic Lars Audia
Claudine Claudio as Paramedic Silva
 Ed Lauter as Fire Captain Dannaker
Mike Genovese as Officer Al Grabarsky

Family
 Christine Harnos as Jennifer "Jenn" Greene
 Yvonne Zima as Rachel Greene
 Bonnie Bartlett as Ruth Greene
 John Cullum as David Greene
 Jonathan Scarfe as Chase Carter
 Frances Sternhagen as Millicent Carter
 George Plimpton as Grandpa Carter
 Michael Beach as Al Boulet
 Khandi Alexander as Jackie Robbins
 Taraji P. Henson as Patrice Robbins
 Mark Dakota Robinson as Steven Robbins
 Lisa Nicole Carson as Carla Reece
 Victor Williams as Roger McGrath
 Rose Gregorio as Helen Hathaway 
 Trevor Morgan as Scott Anspaugh

Notable guest stars
 John Hawkes as P. A. (Episode 1)
  Nick Offerman as Roger (Episode 1)
 Joe Torry as Chris Law
 Michael Ironside as Dr. William "Wild Willy" Swift
 Carrie Snodgress as Mrs. Lang
 James LeGros as Dr. Max Rocher
 Dan Hedaya as Herb Spivak
 Harold Perrineau as Mr. Price
 Mickey Rooney
 Eva Mendes as Donna
 Michael Rapaport as Paul Canterna (Episode 20)

Episodes

References

External links 
 

1997 American television seasons
1998 American television seasons
ER (TV series) seasons